Admiral Sir Francis William Loftus Tottenham, KCB, CBE (17 August 1880 – 9 November 1967) was a Royal Navy officer who went on to be Commander-in-Chief, Africa Station.

Naval career
Tottenham, the second son of Capt. Francis Loftus Tottenham, joined the Royal Navy as a cadet in 1895. As a midshipman, he was posted to the protected cruiser HMS Charybdis in early 1900. He served on the despatch vessel HMS Surprise when he was promoted to lieutenant on 1 October 1902. He served in World War I with 4th Battle Squadron. After the War he was a member of the Inter-Allied Naval Armistice Commission and Control Commission in Germany. He commanded HMS Delhi from 1920 and then became naval attaché in Washington D. C. in 1922. He later commanded the shore establishment HMS Excellent and then HMS Rodney. He was made rear admiral commanding 3rd Cruiser Squadron in 1932 and Commander-in-Chief, Africa Station in 1935. He retired as a full admiral in 1940.

In 1932, in his 50s, he married Evelyn Rosalie Prescott Street, the widow of Captain Herbert Street, and only daughter of Harry Ernest Prescott. They had one daughter.

Following Tottenham's death, Sir Douglas Marshall, who served with him in the Second World War, eulogised him in The Times:

References

1880 births
1967 deaths
Royal Navy admirals
Knights Commander of the Order of the Bath
Commanders of the Order of the British Empire